Housefull 3 is a 2016 Indian Hindi-language action comedy film co-written and directed by Sajid-Farhad and produced by Sajid Nadiadwala under the banner Nadiadwala Grandson Entertainment. The film is the third installment of the Housefull franchise and is distributed by Eros International. The film stars Akshay Kumar, Abhishek Bachchan, Riteish Deshmukh, Jacqueline Fernandez, Nargis Fakhri, Lisa Haydon, Chunky Pandey, and Jackie Shroff. The film was theatrically released in India on June 3, 2016, and grossed  billion worldwide on a budget of  million.

Plot 

Six years ago ,three robbers attempt to steal jewels from a building in London, but are captured by the police. Six years later, Batook Patel, a wealthy and successful businessman, disapproves marriage of his three beautiful daughters, Ganga, Jamuna, and Saraswati, as he believes that the previous ladies in his family were doomed because of marriage of his own family members.

One night, at a friend's party, the girls reveal to their friend that secretly, they each have a boyfriend. Ganga, Jamuna, and Saraswati are respectively smitten with Sandy (who wants his own football club and a rookie), Teddy (a wannabe racer), and Bunty (a wannabe rapper). Sandy has a self-destructive split personality "Sundy", who awakens whenever Sandy hears the word "Indian". When the girls tell their father about them, Batook takes help of a restaurant owner Aakhri Pasta  who dresses up as the family's fortune teller who claims that when the girl's husbands first see, speak to, or set foot into Batook's house, Batook will die. The girls, wanting to keep their boyfriends, make them pretend to be disabled. Sandy pretends to be crippled, Teddy blind and Bunty mute. At Pasta's restaurant, Batook reveals to Pasta that his daughters are actually the daughters of Urja Nagre, an underworld crime lord.  Batook, a former associate of Nagre's, takes care of the girls while Nagre is in jail. Batook has planned to marry the girls to his three sons, the robbers who tried to steal the jewels. Unbeknownst to him, Nagre has immigrated in London.

While the girls prepare a wax statue for Batook, the boys go into town, where the boys are observed by him to be disabled. Bunty appears crippled, Sandy blind and Teddy mute. Later, Nagre asks Batook, about his daughter's future husbands. Batook says that he knows three men suitable for the daughters. Batook takes Nagre to a Gurdwara to see his sons, claiming they are orphans who do community service. Nagre chooses the three suitable for his daughters.

At Batook's house, Nagre claims that Batook owes him 50 million pounds. Nagre gives the boys 10 days to make up the money, or the girls must marry 'the chosen boys'. During these 10 days, Nagre and "his sons" will also live in Batook's house, meaning that the girls' boyfriends must act in front of just as they were observed by Batook and Nagre. During a party, the girls get Batook's sons — Rishi, Rohan, and Rajeev — drunk. The next day, they are happy to have sex with their respective girls, only to find out that they had sex with the maids. The maids request compensation, or they will sue them. Nagre surrenders to his daughters' pleas of love.

The next day, the girls take their boys to church, for confession because they felt that they were mocking disables by having the boys act as if they were disabled. After this, the boys (and girls) feel guilty, as they were marrying the girls only for money. They go to the warehouse of Madame Tussauds to meet their girlfriends. They instead find Batook's sons whose goons attack them. While Teddy and Bunty fight them, Sandy hears Teddy say "Indian", and Sundy arrives, trying to kill Sandy.  Batook also arrives who is blackmailed by the boys to divide Nagre's fortune into 7 shares. More people come as shares increase considerably. Nagre arrives, and attempts to kill everyone in the warehouse, while the lights turn on and off. As the girls arrive, Rishi, Rohan, and Rajeev see them, and hold them at knifepoint in front of Nagre. Sandy, Teddy, and Bunty then rush to save the girls, injuring themselves in the process. The girls forgive the boys, and the film ends when Batook reveals the whole story planning and the girls and their boyfriends reconcile with Urja Nagre, the girls real father.

Cast 
 Akshay Kumar as Sanket "Sandy" Sehgal/"Sundy"
 Abhishek Bachchan as Bhaskar "Bunty" Mittal
Riteish Deshmukh as Tukaram "Teddy" Chaugule
Jacqueline Fernandez as Ganga "Gracy" 
 Nargis Fakhri as Saraswati "Sarah"
 Lisa Haydon as Jamuna "Jenny"
 Jackie Shroff as Urja Nagre
 Chunkey Pandey as Aakhri Pasta
 Boman Irani as Batook Patel
 Samir Kochhar as Rishi Patel
 Nikitin Dheer as Rohan Patel
 Aarav Chowdhary as Rajeev Patel

Release 
The film was scheduled to release on 18 March 2016, but was pushed and released theatrically on 3 June 2016.

Box office 
It grossed  nett in India on its second day. By the end of its opening weekend, the film had grossed approximately  worldwide.

Music 

The music for Housefull 3 is composed by Sohail Sen, Mika Singh, Shaarib-Toshi and Tanishk Bagchi while the lyrics are written by Sameer Sen, Farhad-Sajid, Sanjeev Chaturvedi, Mamta Sharma, Arafat Mehmood, Rani Malik, Manoj Yadav and Danish Sabri. The background score is given by Julius Packiam. The music rights are acquired by T-Series.
The first song of the film "Pyar Ki" was released on 24 April 2016. The full music album was released on 10 May 2016.

See also 
 Housefull
 Housefull 2
 Housefull 4

References

External links 
 
 
 

2016 films
2016 action comedy films
2010s Hindi-language films
Indian buddy films
Indian sequel films
Indian action comedy films
Films shot in London
Indian heist films
2016 comedy films
2010s buddy films
Films directed by Farhad Samji